This list of fact-checking websites includes websites that provide fact-checking services about both political and non-political subjects.

The Reporters' Lab at Duke University maintains a database of fact-checking organizations that is managed by Mark Stencel and Bill Adair. The database tracks more than 100 non-partisan organizations around the world. The Lab's inclusion criteria are based on whether the organization

By region

Africa 

 Africa Check: Africa's first independent fact-checking organization with offices in Kenya, Nigeria, South Africa, Senegal and the UK checking claims made by public figures and the media in Africa.
 News Verifier Africa: one-stop fact-checking and news verification platform for Africans. The non-profit platform seeks to improve public access to accurate information by simplifying fact-checking and creating varied appealing formats for fact checked news, data and viral images.
 FactCheckHub: This is the verification platform of the International Centre for Investigative Reporting [The ICIR]  aimed at combating misinformation in the society. It is an independent, non-partisan platform for factchecking with the primary aim of combating misinformation, disinformation, hoaxes and rumours about topical issues including the covid-19 pandemic, elections, economy, health, security and governance etc. It is also a signatory   to the International Fact-checking Network's codes of principles.

Asia-Pacific

Australia
International Fact-Checking Network verified signatories:
 RMIT ABC Fact Check: launched in June 2016, jointly funded by RMIT University and the Australian Broadcasting Corporation (ABC).
AAP FactCheck: Part of non-profit national news agency Australian Associated Press; launched in 2019.
Others:

Afghanistan

 Afghan Fact: launched in January 2023, funded by journalists in exile, and not certified by IFCN.

 Hoax Slayer. Defunct since 2021.

Bangladesh 

 FactWatch: IFCN certified independent fact-checking entity affiliated to the University of Liberal Arts Bangladesh.
 Rumor Scanner Bangladesh: IFCN certified independent fact-checking initiative.

Hong Kong
 Factcheck Lab: member of International Fact-Checking Network (IFCN).

India
International Fact-Checking Network verified signatories:
Dfrac.org
Boomlive.in
The Quint
Factcrescendo.com
Youturn.in in Tamil language.
India Today: Fact Check is part of TV Today Network Ltd.
Factly.in
 thip.media: the media arm of The Healthy Indian Project. It was certified by Health On the Net Foundation until June 2021.
Others:

 Alt News
 Vishvasnews.com
 Newsmobile.in
 Newschecker.in

Japan 
 GoHoo: Launched by a nonprofit association Watchdog for Accuracy in News-reporting, Japan (WANJ or 一般社団法人 日本報道検証機構) on November 16, 2014. Crowd-funded approx. 1.6 million yen through Ready For. Awarded Social Business Grand Prize 2012 Summer.
 Japan Center of Education for Journalists (JCEJ): Fosters journalists and fact-checkers by referring to a Journalist's Guide to Social Sources published by First Draft News, a project of the Harvard Kennedy School's Shorenstein Center. JCEJ itself also debunks falsehoods.

Pakistan
 Soch Fact Check

Singapore
 Black Dot Research

Sri Lanka 

 Citizen Fact Check: the first fact-checking agency to be launched by a local media organization in Sri Lanka. It is run by the Citizen Media Network.
 FactCheck.lk
 Watchdog

Taiwan
 MyGoPen: member of International Fact-Checking Network (IFCN).

Europe

Austria 

 Mimikama.at

Bulgaria 

 Factcheck.bg: Bulgarian fact-checking website, a project by the Association of European Journalists-Bulgaria (AEJ-Bulgaria).
 AFP Провери: Bulgarian fact-checking website by Agence France-Presse (AFP) and the Bulgarian journalist Rosen Bosev. "AFP Провери" is a Facebook partner verifying the Bulgarian content on the social media.

Croatia
Faktograf.hr: Croatian fact-checking website set up by the Croatian Journalists' Association and GONG.

Czech Republic
: Czech fact-checking website operated by a politically independent voluntary association, launched in 2016.
Denmark

 TjekDet.dk: Danish fact-checking media focusing on claims affecting the public democratic debate in Denmark. The site was launched in 2016. It is owned by a non-profit independent organization.

Finland
 Faktabaari: Finnish awarded and politically independent fact-checking website, launched in 2014.

France
 Les Décodeurs: French fact-checking blog run by Le Monde.
Factuel: French fact-checking blog run by the Agence France-Presse.
CaptainFact: French collaborative fact-checking platform.
 Science Feedback, Climate Feedback, and Health Feedback: family of websites dedicated to fact-checking media coverage of science, climate change, and health, respectively.

Germany
 Correctiv
 Deutsche Presse-Agentur
 Deutsche Welle. DW Fact Check in English was launched in 2020.
 Tagesschau
 Volksverpetzer: German fact checkers that research and expose fake news.

Georgia 
 FactCheck Georgia: project of the Tbilisi-based think-tank Georgia's Reforms Associates (GRASS), launched in 2013.

Greece
 Ellinikahoaxes.gr: Greek fact-checking website launched in 2013. Debunks hoaxes, urban legends, fake news, internet scams and other stories of questionable origin.
 Greece Fact Check: independent Greek fact-checking website launched in February 2017 specializing in pseudoscience and medical frauds.

Italy
 Bufale.net: National public service for citizens against fakenews 
 Pagella Politica: Italian fact-checking website.
 Butac.it: Fact-checking website created in 2013
 Facta.news

Lithuania
 Demaskuok.lt and Debunk.org: launched by Delfi and other Lithuanian online media.

Norway
 Faktisk.no: fact-checking site focusing on public debate in Norway. Set up by rival Norwegian media outlets and a part of IFCN.

Poland
Demagog: the first fact-checking website in Poland, dedicated to fact check political statements. Member of International Fact-Checking Network at Poynter Institute.
Pravda.org.pl: Polish fact-checking association. Member of International Fact-Checking Network at Poynter Institute.

Portugal
Observador: newspaper with a fact-checking section called Fact Check. First Portuguese member of International Fact-Checking Network at Poynter Institute.
Polígrafo: online fact-checking website. Also featured on a SIC news programme.

Romania
Factual.ro: launched by the Funky Citizens organization.

Spain
 Comprobado (hosted by Maldita.es).
Miniver.org: the first fact-checking web in Spain, launched in 2017, with the purpose of debunking fake news. Accredited by Google as fact-checking organization.
 Newtral: Spanish fact-checking organization founded by journalist Ana Pastor from LaSexta. Currently the official news verifier for Facebook Spain.
 Maldita.es: independent Spanish fact-checking organization.
 Verificat.cat: the first fact-checking platform in Catalonia, the only one with the recognition of the International Fact-Checking Network (Poynter Institute) and the European Disinformation Observatory.

Ukraine
 VoxCheck: unveiled by VoxUkraine, an online economics and policy project, in 2015.
 FactCheck Ukraine: launched by the Kyiv-based Ukrainian Team of Reformers in 2016.
StopFake: launched by the Kyiv Mohyla Journalism School in 2014.

United Kingdom
 BBC Reality Check
 Full Fact: independent fact-checking organization based in the UK which aims to "promote accuracy in public debate", launched in 2009.
 FactCheckNI: the first independent dedicated fact-checking service for Northern Ireland, launched in 2016, checking claims as well as offering training in critical thinking, tools and techniques any member of the public can use.
 The FactCheck blog: fact-checking blog run by the Channel 4 News organization in the UK.
 Ferret Fact Service: Scotland's first fact-checker launched in April 2017 after a grant from the Google Digital News Initiative.
 Logically

Latin America

Argentina 
 Chequeado.com
Reverso

Bolivia 
 Bolivia Verifica
Chequea Bolivia

Brazil 
IFCN verified signatories:
 Agência Lupa
 Aosfatos.org
 UOL Confere

Others:

 Agência Pública - Truco no Congresso
 Boatos.org
 Comprova
 E-farsas
 É isso Mesmo? (from O Globo)
 Portal EBC's Hoax reports

Chile 
 ChileCheck
Del dicho al hecho
El Polígrafo (from El Mercurio)

Colombia 
 Colombia Check
Detector de Mentiras

Guatemala 
 Con Pruebas

Mexico 
 Checa Datos
El Sabueso
Verificado

Peru 
 Ama Llulla
OjoBiónico

Uruguay 
 UYcheck

Venezuela 
 Cotejo
Efecto Cocuyo
Verifikado

Middle East

Iran 
 Gomaneh: online Persian magazine devoted to the investigation of rumors and hearsay.
 Factnameh: online Persian magazine launched in 2017 by the ASL19 organization. It mostly focuses on fact-checking quotes from Iranian governmental figures or rumours spread on social media.

Jordan
 Fatabyyano: independent fact-checking platform, which is considered the leading fact-checking platform in the MENA region. Fatabyyano is the first and only Arabian platform certified by the IFCN. The platform has several million followers, and had received an award from the Harvard Arab Alumni Association in 2016, as well as from Queen Rania of Jordan.

Turkey 
 Teyit: independent fact-checking organization based in Turkey and a signatory to the International Fact-Checking Network’s Code of Principles and is one of the partners of First Draft News.
Doğruluk Payı: independent fact-checking organization that focuses on verifying the factual accuracy of statements by Turkish politicians.
Malumat Furuş: independent organization fact-checking articles published on printed and online media

North America

Canada 
 FactsCan
 Décrypteurs: focuses on the spread of false information on social media.
 Rumor Detector by Agence Science-Presse

United States 

 AFP Fact Check from Agence France-Presse: originally launched in France in 2017, now global and available in multiple languages. ICFN signatory. Facebook partner.
FactCheck.org and FactCheckEd.org: self-described "advocates for voters that aims to reduce the level of deception and confusion in U.S. politics," and serving as an educational resource for high school teachers and students, respectively (the latter founded 2005). They are projects of the Annenberg Public Policy Center of the Annenberg School for Communication at the University of Pennsylvania, and are funded primarily by the Annenberg Foundation.
 Fact Checker (The Washington Post): project of The Washington Post, known for grading politicians on the factual accuracy of their statements with zero to four "Pinocchios." Created September 2007 by Post diplomatic writer Michael Dobbs specifically for the 2008 presidential election. Ceased operation November 4, 2008, but relaunched with a broader focus in January 2011, led by veteran Post diplomatic correspondent Glenn Kessler.
Lead Stories: fact checks posts that Facebook flags but also use its own technology, called "Trendolizer," to detect trending hoaxes from hundreds of known fake news sites, satirical websites and prank generators.
 PolitiFact: service of the Tampa Bay Times created in August 2007, uses the "Truth-o-Meter" to rank the amount of truth in public persons' statements. 2009 Pulitzer Prize Winner.
 Snopes: focuses on, but is not limited to, validating and debunking urban legends and other stories in American popular culture.
 RealClearPolitics's Fact Check Review: aspires to offer quaternary-level critiquing of such tertiary-level efforts at fact-checking as those listed above. Within its inaugural review item on April 9, 2018, RCP writer Kalev Leetaru said its efforts at "checking the fact checkers" were to "explore how the flagship fact-checking organizations operate in practice (as opposed to their self-reported descriptions), from their claim and verification sourcing to their topical focus to just what constitutes a 'fact.'" Leetaru is a Georgetown University fellow in residence, holding the chair established there for study and promotion of "international values, communications technology and the global Internet."
 VietFactCheck: A volunteer-led program seeking to offer Vietnamese Americans with fact-checked, contextualized, source-verified analysis in English and Vietnamese.

Fraudulent fact-checking websites
Fact Check Armenia: a website with ties to Turkish government-related organizations that  denies the historical facts of the Armenian genocide.
Fact Checking Turkey: operated by PR company Bosphorus Global and  counters criticism of Turkey in foreign media. It treats statements by Turkish government officials as arbiters of the truth.
Mediekollen: far-right Swedish website.

References